The siege of Savendroog (also commonly spelled Sevendroog or Severndroog, but now known as Savandurga) was conducted by British East India Company forces under the command of General Charles Cornwallis in December 1791, during the Third Anglo-Mysore War. The fortress of Savendroog, was held by the forces of Tipu Sultan, the ruler of Mysore. The British eventually retreated after Tipu Sultan successfully defended the fort by leading a cavalry charge against the British forces.

References

Marshman, John Clark (1863). The history of India

Savendroog
Savendroog 1791
Savendroog 1791
Savendroog 1791
Savendroog 1791
Military history of India
1791 in India